Eduard Shafransky (16 October 1937 – 18 December 2005) was a Russian classical guitarist and composer.

Life 
Eduard Shafransky was born on October 16, 1937 in the Siberian town Krasnoyarsk. From 1961 to 1965 he studied classical guitar at the Tchaikovsky College of Music in Sverdlovsk (today Yekaterinburg), where he founded the ensemble for old music Renaissance and the music festival Evenings of April. In the last years of his life Shafransky composed several pieces for guitar. In 2002, during a concert in Yekaterinburg,  he met the internationally known Austrian guitarist Johanna Beisteiner, who since then played several world premieres of his works, such as Caravaggio oggi for guitar, of which a video clip was published in 2010 by the Hungarian label Gramy Records.

List of works for guitar solo (incomplete) 
Requiem for guitar (World premiere on September 24, 2004 at St.-Blasius Church, Klein-Wien near Furth bei Göttweig, Austria)
Caravaggio oggi or Reflections on a painting by Caravaggio (World premiere on October 29, 2007, Dom Aktyora, Yekaterinburg, Russia)
Night in Granada (World premiere on October 29, 2007, Dom Aktyora, Yekaterinburg, Russia)
Old quarters of Alanya (World premiere on May 18, 2009, Festival Bravo, Yekaterinburg, Russia)
Songs of breakers (World premiere on May 18, 2009, Festival Bravo, Yekaterinburg, Russia)

Discography 
 Johanna Beisteiner: Live in Budapest (DVD, Gramy Records, 2010) with the video clip Caravaggio oggi to music by von Eduard Shafransky;

References

External links 
 List of works by Eduard Shafransky on the official website of Johanna Beisteiner.
 Scores and Samples of Shafransky’s works in the archive of Boris Tarakanov (Russian)

Russian composers
Russian male composers
Composers for the classical guitar
1937 births
2005 deaths
Musicians from Krasnoyarsk
20th-century Russian male musicians